Hendrik Schatz is a professor of Nuclear Astrophysics at Michigan State University.  He earned his Diploma from the University of Karlsruhe in 1993, and his PhD from the University of Heidelberg in 1997 after completing his thesis work at the University of Notre Dame. He is one of the Principal Investigators for the Joint Institute for Nuclear Astrophysics and is a leading expert on nuclear astrophysics,. Schatz also serves the science advisory committees for the Facility for Rare Isotope Beams and GSI. Hendrik's primary field of expertise is Type I X-ray Bursts. His most notable contribution to this field is the discovery of the SnTeSb-cycle.  Hendrik was featured in Science magazine November 22, 2002 for his work on experimental nuclear astrophysics.  Hendrik has also contributed to Physics Today.

His APS Fellowship citation is:

References

External links 
 National Superconducting Cyclotron Laboratory Profile
 Scientists brew up 'missing link' isotope
  (talk given on March 4, 2015)
  (presented by Hendrik Schatz)
 

21st-century German physicists
Michigan State University faculty
Experimental physicists
Year of birth missing (living people)
Living people

 German nuclear physicists

Fellows of the American Physical Society